Aurel D. Léger (10 November 1894 – 28 December 1961) was a Canadian businessman, contractor, farmer and politician. Léger served as a Liberal party member of the House of Commons of Canada. He was born in Grande-Digue, New Brunswick and became a farmer and contractor.

He was educated at Shediac Bridge School, University of St. Joseph's College, Sainte Anne's College and Moncton Business College.

Légere was first elected to Parliament at the Kent riding in the 1940 general election then re-elected in 1945 and 1949. Léger was appointed to the Senate on 12 June 1953, towards the end of the 21st Canadian Parliament. He remained a Senator until his death in 1961.

Electoral record

References

External links
 

1894 births
1961 deaths
Canadian farmers
Canadian senators from New Brunswick
Liberal Party of Canada MPs
Liberal Party of Canada senators
Members of the House of Commons of Canada from New Brunswick